SNP may refer to:

Computing
 SNP (complexity), in theoretical computer science 
 SNP file format, for Microsoft Access reports
 Scalable Networking Pack, to extend Microsoft Windows Server 2003 
 Secure Network Programming, a prototype  Internet protocol and API
 SnP file or Touchstone file, an electrical circuit simulation data format

Entertainment
 The Sunday Night Project, a British television show
 "SNP (Shining Nature Purity)", a 2020 song by W24

Places
 Six Nations Polytechnic, post-secondary institution in Ontario, Canada
 State Nature Preserves of the Kentucky State Nature Preserves Commission
 SNP Stadium, Banská Bystrica, Slovakia

Political parties
 Scottish National Party, Scotland
 Seychelles National Party
 Socialist People's Party of Montenegro
 Serbian People's Party, Serbia

Science
 Single-nucleotide polymorphism, a DNA sequence variation
 Sodium nitroprusside, a peripheral vasodilator

Other uses
 Sinopec's NYSE ticker symbol
 Social networking potential in marketing research
 Special needs plan, a Medicare Advantage plan

See also